Deois flavopicta is a species from the subgenus Acanthodeois.

References

Cercopidae
Insects described in 1854